Fissurisepta is a genus of keyhole limpets, marine gastropod mollusc in the family Fissurellidae.

Species
Species within the genus Fissurisepta include:
Fissurisepta enderbyensis (Powell, 1958)
Fissurisepta fumarium (Hedley, 1911)
Fissurisepta granulosa Jeffreys, 1883
Fissurisepta manawatawhia Powell, 1937
Fissurisepta onychoides Herbert & Kilburn, 1986
Fissurisepta oxia (Watson, 1883)
Fissurisepta pacifica (Cowan, 1969)
Fissurisepta tenuicula (Dall, 1927)
Species brought into synonymy
 Fissurisepta antarctica Egorova, 1972: synonym of Cornisepta antarctica (Egorova, 1972)
 Fissurisepta crossei (Dautzenberg & H. Fischer, 1896): synonym of Cornisepta crossei (Dautzenberg & H. Fischer, 1896)
 Fissurisepta festiva: synonym of Cornisepta festiva Crozier 1966
 Fissurisepta joschristiaensis Drivas & Jay, 1985: synonym of Puncturella christiaensi Kilburn, 1978
 Fissurisepta microphyma Dautzenberg & Fischer, 1896: synonym of Cornisepta microphyma (Dautzenberg & Fischer, 1896)
 Fissurisepta profundi (Jeffreys, 1877): synonym of Profundisepta profundi (Jeffreys, 1877)
 Fissurisepta rostrata: synonym of Cornisepta rostrata (Seguenza, 1864)

References

 Powell A. W. B., New Zealand Mollusca, William Collins Publishers Ltd, Auckland, New Zealand 1979 
 Gofas, S.; Le Renard, J.; Bouchet, P. (2001). Mollusca, in: Costello, M.J. et al. (Ed.) (2001). European register of marine species: a check-list of the marine species in Europe and a bibliography of guides to their identification. Collection Patrimoines Naturels, 50: pp. 180–213
 Spencer, H.; Marshall. B. (2009). All Mollusca except Opisthobranchia. In: Gordon, D. (Ed.) (2009). New Zealand Inventory of Biodiversity. Volume One: Kingdom Animalia. 584 pp

Fissurellidae
Gastropods of New Zealand